Points North is the second studio album by the instrumental rock band Points North. It was recorded at the Foothill College Studio 1100  and released on April 21, 2015, on Magna Carta Records.

This album is the group's first with bassist Uriah Duffy. It contains a track "Colorblind" that finds the band adding vocal elements to their previous all-instrumental portfolio.  This album has found critical acclaim on rock and progressive rock review sites.

Track listing

Personnel
 Eric Barnett - guitar
 Kevin Aiello - drums
 Uriah Duffy - bass

Additional personnel
 David Earl - keyboards, piano

Credits
 Eric Barnett - producer
 Danny Danzi - associate producer, mixing, mastering
 Dave de Villers - associate producer, recording engineer
 Ian Henry - recording engineer
 Chris Refino - recording engineer
 James Risher - recording engineer
 Anne-Marie Suenram - recording engineer
 Dave Lepori - band photo
 Fernando Ricciardulli - artwork, graphic design
 Laura Fielding - logistics, road crew
 Louis Green - logistics, road crew

Personnel list from AllMusic, additional personnel and credits from the CD artwork.

References

2015 albums
Points North albums
Magna Carta Records albums